The Hotel Café Royal is a five-star hotel at 68 Regent Street in Piccadilly, London. Before its conversion in 2008–2012 it was a restaurant and meeting place known as the Café Royal.

History
The establishment was originally conceived and set up in 1865 by Daniel Nicholas Thévenon, who was a French wine merchant. He had to flee France due to bankruptcy, arriving in Britain in 1863 with his wife, Célestine, and just five pounds in cash. He changed his name to Daniel Nicols and under his management - and later that of his wife - the Café Royal flourished and was considered at one point to have the greatest wine cellar in the world.

By the 1890s the Café Royal had become the place to see and be seen at. Its patrons have included Oscar Wilde, Aleister Crowley, Virginia Woolf, D. H. Lawrence, Winston Churchill, Noël Coward, Brigitte Bardot, J. Paul Getty, Mary Teissier, Max Beerbohm, George Bernard Shaw, Jacob Epstein, Mick Jagger, Elizabeth Taylor, Muhammad Ali and Diana, Princess of Wales.The café was the scene of a famous meeting on 24 March 1895, when Frank Harris advised Oscar Wilde to drop his charge of criminal libel against the Marquess of Queensberry, father of Alfred Douglas. Wilde refused the advice, Queensberry was acquitted, and Wilde was subsequently tried, convicted and imprisoned. From 1951, the Café Royal was the home of the National Sporting Club. It was bought by David Locke in 1972.

Prominent personalities continued to host important events through the early 21st century at the establishment. Kanye West played 20 new songs in 2014 when he DJ'ed at a private party with Frank Ocean at the Café Royal. At a private after-party for the British Fashion Awards, hosted by Kate Moss and Naomi Campbell at Café Royal, guests in attendance included Harry Styles, Cara Delevingne and Rihanna.

Restoration and conversion
The Café Royal closed in December 2008. The fittings and furniture were later sold at auction. The building is a grade II listed building, which will protect its architecturally significant features and fixtures.

David Chipperfield Architects, with Donald Insall Associates, restored and transformed the building into a hotel with 160 rooms and historic suites, an array of dining rooms and bars, a private members club, meeting rooms, ballroom and a wellbeing spa and gym with 18-metre pool. The Oscar Wilde Lounge provides a traditional afternoon tea service. Alrov Properties, a subsidiary of the Israeli Alrov Group, opened the hotel in December 2012 as the second 5 star luxury hotel of The Set. Sister hotels include the Conservatorium in Amsterdam and the Hotel Lutetia in Paris.

References

External links
 
 A brief history and an account of the recent analysis of the decoration.

Restaurants in London
Michelin Guide starred restaurants in the United Kingdom
French restaurants in the United Kingdom
Restaurants established in 1865
1865 establishments in England
Grade I listed buildings in the City of Westminster
cafe Royal
Cafe Royal